Tiffany Denise Andrade Roche is a model and pageant titleholder, born in Caracas, Venezuela on February 11, 1989. She was a contestant in the Ford Models "Supermodel of Venezuela 2007" pageant held in Caracas on November 22, 2007. Andrade represented Yaracuy state in the Miss Venezuela 2008 pageant on September 10, 2008.

References

External links
Miss Venezuela Official Website
Miss Venezuela La Nueva Era MB

1989 births
Living people
People from Caracas
Venezuelan female models